Ecliptopera atricolorata, the dark-banded geometer moth, is a moth of the  family Geometridae. It is found in North America, where it has been recorded from Alabama, Arkansas, Florida, Georgia, Indiana, Kentucky, Maryland, Mississippi, North Carolina, Ohio, Pennsylvania, South Carolina, Tennessee, Virginia and West Virginia.

The wingspan is 28–32 mm. There are brown and white markings on forewings, including a large squarish brown patch and a smaller oval. Adults have been recorded on wing from April to September, with most records from June and July.

References

Moths described in 1867
Cidariini